"While We Are Young" is a collaboration single of Filipino singer-songwriter Keiko Necesario and Filipino rapper Quest. The track was originally released on 30 June 2017 as part of Keiko Necesario's sophomore album Escape and has surpassed 800,000 streams on Spotify from the day of its release. It was re-released on 1 August 2018 by Stages Sessions, as part of the official motion picture soundtrack of the film Ang Babaeng Allergic Sa Wifi.

Composition and lyrics
"While We Are Young" runs for a total of three minutes and fifty-one seconds. The song is set in common time with a tempo of 116 beats per minute and written in the key of D major. The lyrics were written in English by Keiko Necesario and the rap parts by Quest.

Wish 107.5 described "While We Are Young" as "an electro-folk pop track [that] is an ode to taking chances, rising above frustrations, and chasing after one’s biggest dreams".

Reception
Wish 107.5 expressed that "While We Are Young [as] glowing with perkiness and vigor [that] should definitely sit on the top your summer playlist".

Promotion

Live performances
On 29 July 2018, Keiko performed "While We Are Young" on Penshoppe Fancon Crowd.

Radio
On 18 August 2017, Keiko and Quest performed the song on Wish 107.5 Bus.

Credits and personnel
Credits adapted from YouTube:

Lyrics by: Keiko Necesario 
RAP by: Quest
Photo by: Michael Gonzales of Mayad. 
Song produced by: Nick Lazaro (la balls Studio)
LOGO by: Sid Bunye

BGYO version

"While We Are Young" is the first revival single by the Filipino boy group BGYO. The official track was released on 18 June 2021 as a Digital Single by Star Music. It was produced as part of the 4th Season of Coke Studio Philippines' Itodo Mo Beat Mo.

Composition
BGYO's version of "While We Are Young" runs for a total of four minutes. The song is set in common time with a tempo of 120 beats per minute and written in the key of F♯/G♭ minor.

Background and release
BGYO's version of "While We Are Young" was first revealed in the first episode of Coke Studio Philippines' Itodo Mo Beat Mo on 17 May 2021. On 18 June 2021, the track was officially released as a single via digital download accompanied by a lyric video uploaded by Star Music on YouTube.

Reception
Arambulo Live shared "BGYO made sure to put their own spin on the cover by speeding up the track a bit and including awesome dance moves!"

In popular culture
 On 26 July 2018, Filipina actress Sue Ramirez covers the song on Wish 107.5 Bus. She also performed the song on the virtual launch of Kawaii Whitening Soap, on  10 June 2021.

See also
BGYO discography
List of BGYO live performances

References

External links
 

Keiko Necesario songs
BGYO songs
2017 songs
2021 singles
Star Music singles
English-language Filipino songs